Dudhawa is a village in Kanker district of Chhattisgarh state of India. The village is known for Dudhawa Dam built across Mahanadi river constructed between 1953 and 1964.

See also
 Dudhwa National Park

References 

Villages in Dhamtari district
Dams on the Mahanadi River